The Sultan of Morocco is an 1845 oil on canvas painting by the French Romantic and Orientalist painter Eugène Delacroix, now in the Musée des Augustins de Toulouse. Its full title is Moulay Abd-Er-Rahman, Sultan of Morocco, leaving his palace of Meknès, surrounded by his guards and his principal officers. It shows Sultan Abd al-Rahman of Morocco.

References

1845 paintings
Collections of the Musée des Augustins
Paintings by Eugène Delacroix
History paintings
Horses in art